After the Devastation is a two-CD album by Leæther Strip, and is his comeback album after a five-year hiatus. Some editions of the album included the bonus EP ÆFTERSHOCK. The album peaked at #1 on the German Alternative Charts (DAC) and ranked #6 on the DAC Top 50 Albums of 2006.

Track listing 
Disc 1
 The Shame Of A Nation (Album Edit)
 Back In Control
 Death Is Walking Next To Me (Album Edit)
 A Boy
 Dying Is Easy – Life Is Harder (Daddy Please Love Me)
 Sleep Is Only Heartbreak
 Slam
 Smerte
 Happy Pills (Gimme Gimme)
 Rip Like Cat Claws
 What If...
 Inner Exploration
Disc 2
 Gaza Strip (March Of The Innocent)
 Suicide Bombers (Album Edit)
 Carry Me (2006)
 Empty Space
 Junkie Do – Junkie Die
 Homophobia
 This Is Where I Wanna Be (Album Edit)
 One Man's Gain Another Man's Pain
 Give Us Some Shelter (Katrina)
 One For One For One
 I Was Born That Day
 Leæther Strip Part 3 (Symphony For Kurt)

References 

2005 albums
Leæther Strip albums